Həsənxanlı is a village in the municipality of Əfətli in the Agdam District of Azerbaijan.

References

Populated places in Aghdam District